A. R. Ameen (born 6 January 2003) is an Indian playback singer. He started his singing career in the film O Kadhal Kanmani which was composed by his father A.R.Rahman and has since sung in several Indian languages.

Discography

Music videos

Awards

References

2003 births
Living people
Marathi playback singers
Indian child singers
Tamil playback singers
Telugu playback singers
Bollywood playback singers
Indian male playback singers
Singers from Chennai
21st-century Indian singers
21st-century Indian male singers
Indian Sufis
Qadiri order